Gerd Otto Lichtenhahn (15 January 1910 – 21 August 1964) was a German architect and member of the Association of German Architects (BDA).

Life and realisations 
Born in Essen, Lichtenhahn was the son of the architect Karl August Lichtenhahn, who was employed by the city of Essen. The father enabled him (as well as the younger daughter Renate) after attending a secondary school and an arts and crafts school in Basel (both children had Swiss citizenship), from 25 September 1925 he began attending the Untersekunda (UII, 10th grade) of the reform educational  Schule am Meer on the East Frisian Islands Juist, from which he left on 18 July 1926 without graduating, to continue his school career there from 14 January 1927. On 24 January 1929, he left there prematurely without graduating, the school-leaving examinations took place annually in March.

He later studied architecture and lived and worked in Hanover. There he was responsible in an architectural partnership with Ernst Friedrich Brockmann for the construction of the Europahalle, built in 1950, and the Leuchtenhochhaus and the Elektrohalle, completed in 1958, all on the Hannover Fairground. 

Together with Ernst Brockmann, Lichtenhahn won the architectural competition to build the Grugahalle in Essen, which was completed in 1958. He maintained his own office in Essen for this purpose. His further designs contributed to the  expansion with regard to the  there. His designs also included the Hövel primary school in Essen-Altenessen.  

Essen's Gildenplatz - renamed Kennedyplatz in 1963 in memory of the assassinated US president - was redesigned according to Lichtenhahn's plans and featured an elongated, terraced fountain on its eastern long side (demolished in 1989). He also designed several residential buildings on Lanterstraße in Essen-Bergerhausen.

Lichtenhahn died in Hanover at the age of 54.

Buildings and drafts 
 1950: Europahalle on the Hanover Fairground (with Ernst Brockmann).
 1953: Theater am Aegi (with Hans Klüppelberg).
 1953: durch die British Zone freigegebene, dann durch Lichtenhahn und Hans Klüppelberg umgebaute und erweiterte Maschseegaststätte in Hannover
 1955: Mietswohnhäuser Riepestraße 1–8 and Hildesheimer Straße 220/212 in Hanover (with Hans Klüppelberg).
 1955: Geschäftsgebäude im  in Hanover (with Hans Klüppelberg).
 1956: Verwaltungsgebäude der , Volgersweg/Ecke Hinüberstraße in Hannover (with Hans Klüppelberg).
 1956: Kleiderfabrik Odermark in Goslar (with Ernst Brockmann).
 1958  Leuchtenhochhaus and Elektrohalle auf dem Messegelände Hannover (with the architects Ernst Brockmann, Fr. Hüper and E. Teerling).
 1958: Grugahalle in Essen (with Ernst Brockmann)
 1960er Jahre: Gestaltung Kennedyplatz in Essen
 1964: Grugabad in Essen

Awards 

References 

20th-century German architects
Architects from Hanover
1910 births
1964 deaths
People from Essen